Jo Kwan-woo (born August 3, 1965) is a South Korean singer and actor. He debuted as a singer in 1994 and experienced great success with his second album, 1995's Memory, which sold 3 million copies and is considered one of the best albums of the 1990s by South Korean music critics. He has released nine full-length albums over the course of his career.

Personal life 
Jo's father is Jo Tong-dal, who is a pansori singer.

Discography

Studio albums

Filmography

Television show
2011: Sunday Night (우리들의 일밤)
2011: 청담동살아요

Film
2015: Detective K: Secret of the Lost Island
2018: Keys to the Heart

Television series
2011–12: Living Among the Rich

References

1965 births
Living people
South Korean male singers
South Korean male film actors